James House may refer to:

 James House (singer) (born 1955), country music artist
 James House (album)

United States 
(by state, then city/town)

 Randolph James House, El Dorado, Arkansas, listed on the National Register of Historic Places (NRHP)
 James House (Rogers, Arkansas), NRHP-listed
 James House (D. L. James House), Carmel Highlands, California; Charles Sumner Greene 1918
 Dr. James House, Searcy, Arkansas, NRHP-listed
 James House (Pensacola, Florida), NRHP-listed
 C. N. James Cabin, Augusta, Kansas, NRHP-listed
 T.L. James House, Ruston, Louisiana, listed on the NRHP in Lincoln Parish
 Capt. Benjamin James House, Scituate, Massachusetts, NRHP-listed
 Joseph K. James House, Somerville, Massachusetts, NRHP-listed
 Jesse James House, St. Joseph, Missouri, NRHP-listed
 Benjamin James House, Hampton, New Hampshire, NRHP-listed
 Charles Worth James House, Logan, Ohio, listed on the NRHP in Hocking County
 W. Leland James House, Portland, Oregon, listed on the NRHP in Multnomah County
 Morgan James Homestead, New Britain, Pennsylvania, NRHP-listed
 William Apollos James House, Bishopville, South Carolina, NRHP-listed
 Louie James House, Greer, South Carolina, NRHP-listed
 James House (Belton, Texas), listed on the NRHP in Bell County
 John P. and Sarah James House, Paradise, Utah, listed on the NRHP in Cache County
 Francis Wilcox James House, Port Townsend, Washington, listed on the NRHP in Jefferson County
 Samuel D. James House, Waukesha, Wisconsin, listed on the NRHP in Waukesha County